Heba Hefny (born October 16, 1972) is an Egyptian Olympic judoka. She represented Egypt in 3 Summer Olympics tournaments; 1992, 1996 and 2000.

Olympic participation

Barcelona 1992
Judo – Women's Heavy Weight

Final Standing: 20th T.

Atlanta 1996
Judo – Women's Heavy Weight

Final Standing: 9th T.

Sydney 2000
Judo – Women's Heavy Weight

Final Standing: 9th T.

References 

1972 births
Egyptian female judoka
Olympic judoka of Egypt
Judoka at the 1992 Summer Olympics
Judoka at the 1996 Summer Olympics
Judoka at the 2000 Summer Olympics
Living people
Mediterranean Games silver medalists for Egypt
Mediterranean Games medalists in judo
Competitors at the 2001 Mediterranean Games
20th-century Egyptian women
21st-century Egyptian women
African Games medalists in judo
Competitors at the 1995 All-Africa Games
Competitors at the 1999 All-Africa Games
African Games gold medalists for Egypt